Omid Sharifinasab (born May 22, 1977) is a retired Iranian footballer and coach who last played for Sanat Naft in Iran Pro League and now is assistant coach of the club.

He played for Saipa in the 2008 AFC Champions League group stages.

Club career

Club career statistics

 Assist Goals

References

Iranian footballers
Association football midfielders
Foolad FC players
Sanat Naft Abadan F.C. players
Saipa F.C. players
Persian Gulf Pro League players
1977 births
Living people
Sportspeople from Khuzestan province